Tour de Bretagne Féminin is a women's staged cycle race which takes place in Brittany in north-west France. The race was previously known as the Tour de Bretagne International Féminin in 2004 and Tour de Bretagne Féminin from 2007 through to 2019.

Overall winners

Jerseys
 General classification leader – overall rider of the race with the lowest cumulative time
 Youth classification leader – overall youth rider of the race with the lowest cumulative time
 Points classification leader – overall rider with the highest accumulated points
 Mountains classification leader – overall rider with the highest accumulated mountain points

References

Cycle races in France
Women's road bicycle races
Sport in Finistère